Aleksandr Zlydenny (born 6 November 1968) is a Soviet sports shooter. He competed in the men's 10 metre air rifle event at the 1992 Summer Olympics.

References

1968 births
Living people
Soviet male sport shooters
Olympic shooters of the Unified Team
Shooters at the 1992 Summer Olympics
Place of birth missing (living people)